Basico may refer to:

Basicò, a comune (municipality) in the Province of Messina, Sicily
Básico, a 1993 album by Alejandro Sanz